Dundalk entered the 2017 season as the reigning League Champions from 2016, having won the title for the third year in a row, and having come off a successful Europa League run that saw them become the first Irish club to both win points and win a match in the group stage of European competition. 2017 was Stephen Kenny's fifth season at the club as manager. It was Dundalk's ninth consecutive season in the top tier of Irish football, their 82nd in all, and their 91st in the League of Ireland.

Season summary
The new season's curtain raiser - the President's Cup - was played on 17 February in Turners Cross between Dundalk and Cork City - the winners of the FAI Cup the previous year. Cork City won on a scoreline of 3-0. The 33 round League programme commenced on 24 February 2017, and was completed on 27 October 2017. Dundalk relinquished their title to Cork City, finishing as runners-up. They subsequently lost the 2017 FAI Cup Final to Cork City in a penalty shoot-out after the match finished 1-1. However, Kenny's side did pick up the club's sixth League Cup, with a 3-0 victory over Shamrock Rovers in the final. They were also runner-up in the Leinster Senior Cup, losing 4-2 to Shelbourne in the final.

In Europe they were knocked out at the first hurdle, losing to Rosenborg after extra-time in the Champions League second qualifying round. This was a disappointment after the club's exploits in 2016, even with the financial and organisational disparity between the sides.

First-Team Squad (2017)
Sources:

Competitions

President's Cup
Source:

Premier Division

FAI Cup
Source:
First Round

Second Round

Quarter Final

Semi Final

Replay

Final

League Cup
Source:
Second Round

Quarter Final

Semi Final

Final

Leinster Senior Cup
Source:
Fourth Round

Quarter Final

Semi Final

Final

Europe

Champions League
Source:
Second qualifying round

Rosenborg won 3–2 on aggregate.

Awards

Player of the Month

Footnotes

References

Dundalk F.C. seasons
Dundalk